XSET is an American professional esports and entertainment organization based in Boston, Massachusetts. It has rosters competing in Fortnite, Rocket League, Call of Duty: Warzone, Call of Duty: Mobile, PUBG Mobile, Madden NFL, Apex Legends, Tom Clancy's Rainbow Six Siege,Halo Infinite and iRacing.

History
On July 16, 2020, XSET was founded by a group of former executives at FaZe Clan. Shortly after its launch, XSET announced their Fortnite roster. By the end of 2020, XSET established divisions in PUBG Mobile, Rocket League, Valorant, and Counter-Strike: Global Offensive. The also partnered with several brands, including sports nutrition brand GHOST and game controller company, Scuf Gaming. Additionally, in October 2020, Swae Lee joined the organization as its first official investor.

In 2021, XSET partnered with peripheral and memory partner HyperX and Lightwork Worldwide.

Rosters

Source:

References

External links
Official website

Apex Legends teams
Fortnite teams
Halo (franchise) teams
Rocket League teams
Tom Clancy's Rainbow Six Siege teams
Valorant teams
Esports teams based in the United States
Call of Duty teams
Esports teams established in 2020